Wilhelm Eugen Ludwig Ferdinand von Rohr (born 17 May 1783, Brandenburg an der Havel - died 15 March 1851, Glogau) was a Prussian general and minister of war.

On 4 October 1842 he married Auguste Gräfin von Rittberg (1824–1906).

Literature 
 
 
 Allgemeine Militair-Encyclopädie. Band 8, p. 23.
 Kurt von Priesdorff: Soldatisches Führertum. Band 5, Hanseatische Verlagsanstalt Hamburg, ohne Jahr, S. 99–102.

1783 births
1851 deaths
Prussian Ministers of War
Generals of Infantry (Prussia)
People from Brandenburg an der Havel
Military personnel from Brandenburg
German military personnel of the Napoleonic Wars